Munetoki (written: 宗辰 or 宗時) is a masculine Japanese given name. Notable people with the name include:

 (1565–1593), Japanese samurai
 (1725–1747), Japanese daimyō

Japanese masculine given names